Lang Lang (born 1982) is a Chinese pianist.

Lang Lang may also refer to:
 Lang Lang, Victoria, a town in Australia
 Lang Lang River, a river in Gippsland, Victoria, Australia
 A character from the Japanese manga Steam Detectives

See also
Cananga odorata, a tree valued for its perfume whose common names include Ylang-ylang and ilang-ilang